Djo Tunda Wa Munga (born 1972) is a Congolese film director and producer. For his 2010 thriller movie Viva Riva! he won the award for Best Director at the African Movie Academy Awards in 2011. Viva Riva! also won at the 2011 MTV Movie Awards for Best African Movie

The film was released in 18 African countries and portrayed a gritty view of life in Kinshasa. It was the first Congolese film produced since the Mobutu Sese Seko shut the industry down 25 years before. Riva, a charming  seller of black-market gasoline, falls in love with the girlfriend of a Kinshasa crime boss. Angolese actor Hoji Fortuna also won best supporting actor at the MTV Movie Awards for his portrayal of a hustler named Cesar.

References

External links

Living people
1972 births
People from Kinshasa
Democratic Republic of the Congo film directors
Democratic Republic of the Congo film producers
Best Director Africa Movie Academy Award winners
21st-century Democratic Republic of the Congo people